Anderson Ricardo dos Santos (born 22 March 1983 in Marilia), known as just Anderson, is a Brazilian football striker.

Career

FC Seoul
Player In Negotiation For the season 2011/2012 With Stade Tunisien, 5th In Tunisian League.
In July 2009, Anderson signed a contract with FC Seoul.

He made his K-League debut on 15 August 2009 in FC Seoul's 2-1 win at home to Gyeongnam FC. He scored his first goal for FC Seoul in a 2–0 win over Jeju United on 4 October 2009, and he scored his two consecutive matches goal in a match against Pohang Steelers on 7 October 2009. Anderson scored goal in three consecutive matches in a 2-2 home draw against Busan I'Park on 17 October 2009.
He scored 3 goals in 11 appearances in the 2009 K-League Regular Season and 1 goals in 2 appearances in the 2009 K-League Cup.

Club career statistics

Last update:  23 September 2010 

 Assist Goals

References

External links
 Profile at TFF.org 
 

1983 births
Living people
Brazilian footballers
Brazilian expatriate footballers
Brazilian expatriate sportspeople in Turkey
Expatriate footballers in Turkey
Mogi Mirim Esporte Clube players
Sivasspor footballers
Eskişehirspor footballers
Çaykur Rizespor footballers
Süper Lig players
Brazilian expatriate sportspeople in South Korea
K League 1 players
FC Seoul players
Esteghlal F.C. players
Tianjin Tianhai F.C. players
Clube Atlético Votuporanguense players
China League One players
Expatriate footballers in South Korea
Expatriate footballers in Iran
Expatriate footballers in China
Brazilian expatriate sportspeople in China
Association football forwards